Lynn Luria Sukenick (September 11, 1937, New York, New York – March 14, 1995, Cambridge, Massachusetts) was an American poet. She is also credited with coining the terms "daughter centric", and "matrophobic".

Life
She received her undergraduate education at Brandeis University. She received a doctorate in English from City University of New York.

She taught at San Diego State University, University of California at San Diego, University of California, Irvine, University of California, Santa Cruz, Cornell University, Cleveland State University, the New College of California.

She married Ronald Sukenick, but divorced in 1984.  He collaborated with her in his story "Roast Beef: A Slice 
of Life" in The Death of the Novel and Other Stories.

Her work appeared in Ironwood, Quarry List, Five Finders Review, California Quarterly,

She coined the term matrophobia, the fear of becoming one's mother, in her work on Doris Lessing.

Awards
 1977-1978 Amy Lowell Poetry Travelling Scholarship

Work

Poetry books

Short stories

Criticism

References

1937 births
1995 deaths
Brandeis University alumni
Graduate Center, CUNY alumni
University of California, Irvine faculty
University of California, Santa Cruz faculty
Cornell University faculty
Cleveland State University faculty
New College of California faculty
20th-century American poets
University of California, San Diego faculty
American women poets
20th-century American women writers